Women's Downhill World Cup 1990/1991

Calendar

Final point standings

In Women's Downhill World Cup 1990/91 all results count.

Women's Downhill Team Results

bold indicate highest score - italics indicate race wins

References

External links
 

World Cup
FIS Alpine Ski World Cup women's downhill discipline titles